Botond Baráth (born 21 April 1992) is a Hungarian football player who plays for Vasas as a defender.

Club career
From Budapest, Baráth is a  right-footed central defender, who joined his hometown club Budapest Honved FC as a youth. After making 213 first-team appearances in all competitions since 2009 during which he helped Honved to the 2016–17 Hungarian first-division title, Barath was announced as moving to MLS fulfilling an international slot for Sporting Kansas City.

On 11 July 2020, Sporting Kansas City agreed to transfer Baráth back to Honvéd.

On 21 June 2022, Baráth signed a three-year contract with Vasas.

International career
Baráth earned his first three caps for the Hungary national team in 2018. He made his international debut in a 3–3 draw at Estonia on 15 October 2018 in the UEFA Nations League before earning consecutive starts in 2–0 wins over Estonia and Finland in November 2018.

Club statistics

Updated to games played as of 15 May 2022.

Honours

Honvéd
Nemzeti Bajnokság I: 2016–17

References

External links

 
 
 Botond Baráth at HLSZ 

1992 births
Footballers from Budapest
21st-century Hungarian people
Living people
Hungarian footballers
Hungary international footballers
Association football defenders
Budapest Honvéd FC players
Nemzeti Bajnokság I players
Sporting Kansas City players
Sporting Kansas City II players
Vasas SC players
USL Championship players
Major League Soccer players
Hungarian expatriate footballers
Expatriate soccer players in the United States
Hungarian expatriate sportspeople in the United States